Golborne North railway station served the town of Golborne, in the Metropolitan Borough of Wigan, Greater Manchester, England.

The station was on the Liverpool, St Helens and South Lancashire Railway line from Lowton St Mary's to the original St Helens Central railway station. It was located just east of where it crossed both the WCML and what is now the A573, at the northern edge of the town.

The station was built of wood and had very sparse facilities.

History
Opened by the Liverpool, St Helens and South Lancashire Railway, as part of the Great Central Railway, it became part of the London and North Eastern Railway during the Grouping of 1923. The station then passed on to the London Midland Region of British Railways on nationalisation in 1948. The station was referred to locally as "Golborne GC" to distinguish it from the ex-LNWR Golborne station on the West Coast Main Line in the centre of the town. In 1949, the ex-LNWR station was renamed Golborne South and the ex-GCR station was renamed Golborne North.

Services
In 1922, five "down" (towards St Helens) trains called at the station on Mondays to Saturdays. They called at all stations from Manchester Central to St Helens via Glazebrook and Culcheth.

By 1948, four trains plied between St Helens Central and Manchester Central, calling at all stations, Monday to Friday, reduced to three on Saturdays.

A fuller selection of public and working timetables has now been published. Among other things, this suggests that Sunday services ran until 1914 but had ceased by 1922, never to return.

Closure
The station was closed to all traffic by the British Railways Board in 1952, though goods traffic through the site to St Helens lingered on until 1965, and to a scrapyard in Haydock. In 1968, a new connection ("spur") was built connecting a Shell oil terminal in Haydock, and scrapyard, to the West Coast Main Line. This enabled the line through Golborne North to be closed and lifted.

The site today

By 2005, even seasoned researchers could not tell a railway had ever existed at the station site.

References

Sources

External links
 The station in Disused Stations UK
 The station on an 1888-1913 Overlay OS Map in National Library of Scotland
 1949 services in Disused Stations UK
 The station on a 1948 OS Map in npe Maps
 The station and line overlain on many maps in Rail Map Online
 Station and line HOB1 in Railway Codes

Former Great Central Railway stations
Railway stations in Great Britain opened in 1900
Railway stations in Great Britain closed in 1952
Disused railway stations in the Metropolitan Borough of Wigan
Demolished buildings and structures in Greater Manchester